CSW-ASEAN TOD is a transit-oriented development between four Transjakarta BRT Stations and the ASEAN MRT station on the old Centrale Stichting Wederopbouw or CSW (Central Foundation for Reconstruction) intersection at Kebayoran Baru, Jakarta, Indonesia. This building is a circular crossing bridge with an art-deco that connects four Transjakarta BRT Stations located to the west, east and south of the intersection and the ASEAN MRT Station to the north of the intersection. This building began to open on December 22, 2021 as an operational trial for the integration of integrated highway bus services and integrated highway modes. 

CSW-ASEAN TOD was built together with several other transit oriented developments across Jakarta to facilitate easy transfers by commuters between different mode of public transportation. This TOD resembles a disc when seen from above. It connects four Transjakarta bus stops in the west, east and south of the intersection, and the ASEAN MRT Station to the north of the intersection. It was opened on 22 December 2021 under an operational test on the integration between the Bus rapid transit and the MRT. 

The TOD in the form of an overpass connects the ASEAN MRT Station with the CSW Bus Stop which serves Corridor 13 buses with the Ciledug–Kapten Tendean route, CSW 2 BRT Station which serves Corridor 1 on the Jakarta Kota–Blok M route, the Attorney General's Office BRT Station, and the ASEAN Station on Corridor 1. The five-story building has waiting room facilities and other commercial spaces. The second floor is a connecting bridge from the ASEAN MRT station, the second and third floors has commercials such as retail and shops. The fourth floor is the access to the Transjakarta CSW BRT Station and the 5th floor is the CSW 1 BRT Station.

Background 
Although the Transjakarta Corridor 13 has been operated since August 13 2017, Transjakarta buses have not been able to stop at the CSW bus stop. This is because the position of the bus stop is too high (about 24 meters from the ground) and does not have facilities to facilitate priority passengers, especially the elderly, people with disabilities, pregnant women, and mothers/fathers carrying toddlers. In 2018, Transjakarta had planned that the CSW bus stop could be connected to the ASEAN MRT Station through the procurement of elevators, but this failed to be implemented. 

In 2019, the Jakarta Provincial Government held a CSW integration building design competition, responding to the MRT Jakarta service which began operating that year. As a result, the "Cakra Selaras Wahana" design was chosen as the basis for the implementation of development. It is planned that the construction based on the design will cost thirty billion rupiah.

The construction of this transportation hub began in January 2020 and is targeted to operate in August 2020. However, this building can only be completed in mid-2021. On December 22, 2021, this building was officially opened during the trial period.

Services

Transjakarta 
There are four new Transjakarta bus stops operating at this transportation intersection.  Three Transjakarta bus stops are located on the ground floor of pumpunan moda. Meanwhile, the existing CSW bus stop on the elevated BRT line is on the top floor of the building.

CSW 1 

The bus station, which is located on the Transjakarta elevated lane, serves buses for regular corridors and for cross corridors, all of which are located on Corridor 13, with five platform screen doors in each direction. The station serves corridor 13, 13B, 13C, 13D, and L13E.

CSW 2 
This station only serves Transjakarta non-BRT buses, with two bus stop doors in each direction. This station serves non-BRT route 1C (Blok M–Pesanggrahan), 1M (Meruya–Blok M), and 1Q (Rempoa–Blok M).

ASEAN 
This bus stop serves buses for regular corridors and cross-corridors routes, with three platform screen doors in each direction. This station serves corridor 1 towards Kota only, corridor 6V towards Ragunan only, and 10H towards Tanjung Priok only.

Kejaksaan Agung 
This bus stop only serves corridor 1 buses to the terminus point at the Blok M bus terminal, as well as being the terminus point for route S21 (Ciputat-CSW via Radio Dalam) after previously being shortened from Tosari ICBC, with three platform screen doors on each direction. Other routes that stops in this station are 6M, 6N, 7B, and 10H.

Jakarta MRT 

The CSW-ASEAN TOD also connects the Jakarta MRT service through the ASEAN MRT Station.  Transjakarta users who get off at this transportation interchange can change to the MRT after leaving the paid area and walking through the pedestrian bridge for approximately 50 meters to the station entrance.

Building plan 
The CSW-ASEAN TOD consists of 5 floors of the building. Three Transjakarta shelters are located on the ground floor as well as access to the building. The 2nd floor is for pedestrian access to move between BRT shelters, as well as connecting the building with the MRT station.  Meanwhile, CSW 1 Stop is located on the 5th floor which is the highest floor in this building.

Gallery

References

External links 

South Jakarta
Transport in Jakarta
Transit-oriented developments